Münire Sultan may refer to:
 Münire Sultan (daughter of Abdulmejid I) (1844-1862)
 Münire Sultan (daughter of Şehzade Kemaleddin) (1880-1939)